Kazimierz Wojniakowski (1771/72, Kraków – 1812, Warsaw) was a Polish painter, illustrator and Freemason, known primarily for his portraits in the sentimentalist style.

Life and work
He was a pupil of Marcello Bacciarelli.

His work as a portraitist was influenced by that of the Austrian painter Josef Grassi (who was living in Warsaw at that time), as exemplified in his 1796 Portrait of Izabela Czartoryska, née Fleming.

Other noteworthy portraits by Wojniakowski include Tadeusz Kościuszko, Stanisław August Poniatowski and Stanisław Sołtyk.

He also produced religious works and scenes of contemporary historic events (e.g., The Constitution of May 3, 1791, 1806).

Notable as well are his drawings from journeys, e.g. in Lublin Province.

Selected works

See also
List of Polish artists

Notes

References 
 "Wojniakowski, Kazimierz," Encyklopedia powszechna PWN (PWN Universal Encyclopedia), vol. 4, Warsaw, Państwowe Wydawnictwo Naukowe, 1976, p. 700.

1771 births
1812 deaths
18th-century Polish–Lithuanian painters
18th-century male artists
19th-century Polish painters
19th-century Polish male artists
Kościuszko insurgents
Polish male painters